City Brook also known as Wolf Hollow Creek flows into West Canada Creek by Old City in Herkimer County, New York.

References

Rivers of New York (state)
Rivers of Herkimer County, New York